Remington may refer to:

Organizations 
 Remington Arms, American firearms manufacturer
 Remington Rand, American computer manufacturer
 Remington Products, American manufacturer of shavers and haircare products
 Remington College, American chain of private schools
 Remington Records, American record label
 E. Remington and Sons, American manufacturer of firearms and typewriters 1816–1896
 The Remingtons, American country music group 
 Remington & Co, a British publisher

Places

United States 
 Remington, Indiana
 Remington, Ohio
 Remington, Virginia
 Remington, Wisconsin
 Remington, Baltimore, Maryland
 Remington Ranch, Texas

Antarctica 
 Mount Remington
 Remington Glacier

Other uses
 Remington (album), a 2016 album by Granger Smith
 Remington Steele, an American television series

People

Given name 
 Remington Kellogg (1892–1969), American naturalist and a director of the United States National Museum
 Remington Leith, singer of fashion-art rock band Palaye Royale
 Remington Norman, British merchant and author
 Remington Schuyler (1884–1955), American painter, illustrator, and writer
 Remington D. B. Vernam (1896–1918), American flying ace pilot enlisted in the French Air Force during World War I before transferring to the U.S. Army Air Service
 Remington Vernam (land developer) (1843–1907), American lawyer, real-estate developer, and founder of the Arverne community in Queens, New York

Surname 
 Arthur Remington (1856–1909), New Zealand politician
 Ashley Remington (real name: Dalton Castle) (born 1986), an American pro wrestler in Chikara
 Barbara Remington (1929–2020), American artist and illustrator
 Charles Lee Remington (1922–2007), American entomologist and lepidopterist
 Cyrus Remington (1824–1878), American politician and jurist
 Deborah Remington (1930–2010), American painter
 Eliphalet Remington (1793–1861), American firearms designer
 Emory Remington (1892–1971), American trombonist
 Frank J. Remington (1922–1995), American law professor
 Frederic Remington (1861–1909), American painter and sculptor
 Jennifer Kes Remington, American composer and filmmaker
 Keith Remington (1923–2020), Australian politician
 Mary Remington (1910-2003), British artist
 Phil Remington (1921–2013), American motorsports engineer
 Philo Remington (1816–1889), American firearms and typewriter manufacturer, son of Eliphalet Remington
 Ralph Remington (born 1963), American theater producer and former politician
 William Remington (1917–1954), American economist and McCarthy era "communist suspect"
 William P. Remington (1879–1963), American athlete

Characters 
 Rip Kirby (Remington "Rip" Kirby), a comic strip detective character
 Constable Remington, a character from the comic series Knuckles the Echidna
 Remington Tufflips, a character from Sanjay and Craig
 Charles Remington, a character in the 1996 film The Ghost and the Darkness, played by Michael Douglas

See also
 Rimington (disambiguation)
 Rimmington (disambiguation)
 Remy (disambiguation)
 Remi (disambiguation)

English unisex given names